Al-Salt Sport Club  is a professional football club based in Al-Salt, Jordan. Founded in 1965, Al-Salt first participated in the Jordanian Pro League during the 2018–19 season.

History 
After being crowned champions of the 2017–18 Jordan League Division 1, Al-Salt were promoted to the Jordanian Pro League for the first time in their history. In their first participation in the top division, Al-Salt finished in 5th place in the 2018–19 season. The following season, in 2020, they finished 4th; they qualified to the 2021 AFC Cup as they were only one of three Jordanian teams able to obtain an AFC license.

Players

Current squad

Honours 
 Jordan League Division 1
 Winners (1): 2017–18

Asian record 
 AFC Cup: 1 appearance
 2021: Zonal semi-finals

See also 
 List of football clubs in Jordan

References

External links 
 
 Al-Salt SC at Kooora.com

Al-Salt SC
Football clubs in Jordan
Association football clubs established in 1965
1965 establishments in Jordan